Michigan City Area Schools is a school district based in Michigan City, Indiana in LaPorte County. It serves students in Michigan City and several adjacent towns and villages. It operates one high school, two middle schools, and eight elementary schools. Two schools, Elston Middle School and Niemann Elementary School, closed at the end of the 2013/2014 school year.

Current Facilities

Career and Technical Education

A K Smith Career Center 
A part of the Elston property A K Smith Career Center was built in 1966 and is still serving the community as a career center. It is named after a former Michigan City Area Schools superintendent.

High and Middle Schools

Elston 
Built in 1909 as a high school. In 1924 a junior high school was added to the property. The high school served the community until 1995 when all area high school students began attending Michigan City High School, which, prior to 1995 was known as Rogers. The junior high portion served until 2014.

Elementary schools

References

External links
Michigan City Area Schools website
MCAS Overview at IDOE Website

School districts in Indiana
Education in LaPorte County, Indiana